Eye in the Sky is a 2007 Hong Kong action thriller film starring Simon Yam, Tony Leung Ka-fai and Miss Hong Kong pageant winner Kate Tsui in her film debut. Yam and Tsui play surveillance operatives on the trail of a gang of professional robbers led by Chan Chong-Shan (Leung). The title is derived from the casino surveillance tech "eye in the sky". It marks the directorial debut of Yau Nai-hoi, a long-time screenwriter for films directed by Johnnie To, who co-produced the film with his production company Milkyway Image. Eye in the Sky premiered as an Official Selection at the 2007 Berlin International Film Festival, and as an Opening Film at the Hong Kong International Film Festival. It was released in Hong Kong on 21 June 2007.

Plot
The story begins with a group of organised burglars successfully robbing a jewelry store. Wet-behind-the-ears new recruit Piggy (Kate Tsui) is plunged at the deep end in her first surveillance assignment working alongside her mentor, Sergeant Wong (Simon Yam). They work for the Hong Kong Police Force's Criminal Intelligence Bureau. After reviewing the jewelry store surveillance videos recordings, the force attempts to track down one of the robbers by staking out the neighborhood they think he lives in.

Fatman (Lam Suet) is identified and tracked without his knowledge through a combination of tails, surveillance footage, and data-mining, including accessing his Octopus card. The force ambush is established at the scene of the next robbery, but the elusive Hollow Man (Tony Leung Ka-fai) notices the police. As the robbers flee, some are killed by a Police Tactical Unit, but the rest escape. Chan kills a uniformed police officer as he flees, and Piggy stops to give first aid rather than continue the pursuit.

The surveillance unit is then called to another case; a kidnapping. Piggy is staking out a phone booth where the kidnapper may make a call, when she sees Hollow Man go by. She recognises the kidnapper from Fatman's apartment building and allows the police to rescue the kidnap victim, while she pursues Hollow Man. After a tense confrontation in a cafe, where Hollow Man confronts her, she escapes suspicion, but Hollow Man notices Sergeant Wong and stabs him in the neck with a pair of scissors.  Wong convinces Piggy to continue to follow Hollow Man as he slowly bleeds to death.

Piggy follows Hollow Man to his hideout and calls for the Police Tactical Unit again. Meanwhile, Wong survives his injury and gets medical attention. In the raid on the hideout, Hollow Man flees down a dock and wounds himself mortally in the neck running past a hanging hook, and the other robbers are captured.

Cast
 Simon Yam as Sergeant Wong Man-chin ('Dog Head')
 Tony Leung Ka-fai as Chan Chong-shan ('Hollow Man')
 Kate Tsui as Constable Ho Ka-po ('Piggy'/'Bobo')
 Lam Suet as Ng Tung ('Fatman')
 Maggie Shiu as Madam
 Cheung Siu-fai as Chief Inspector Chan

Reception
The film received generally favourable reception and was hailed for the plot's authentic and dark atmosphere, and realistic use of surveillance tech to make the story believable. One criticism was that the film was too short and therefore not enough for those looking for something more.

Perry Lam of Muse magazine writes, 'If the ending of the movie is more than a little contrived and predictable, there are enough surprises along the way for us to savor before we get there.'

Festivals and awards
Eye in the Sky premiered as an Official Selection at The 2007 Berlin Film Festival and as an Opening Film at The Hong Kong International Film Festival.

Awards and nominations

Remake
A South Korean remake titled Cold Eyes starring Sol Kyung-gu, Jung Woo-sung and Han Hyo-joo was released in 2013.

See also

 List of films featuring surveillance
 Johnnie To filmography

References

External links
 
 
 Eye in the Sky at HKCinemagic.com
 聚言莊﹕The House Where Words Gather
 LoveHKFilm.com Review

2007 films
2000s crime films
2007 action thriller films
Hong Kong crime films
Police detective films
2000s Cantonese-language films
Milkyway Image films
Films about security and surveillance
Films set in Hong Kong
Films shot in Hong Kong
Films with screenplays by Yau Nai-hoi
2007 directorial debut films
2000s Hong Kong films